Mohamed Amine Elyounoussi (born 4 August 1994), nicknamed Moi,  is a professional footballer who plays as a forward or winger for Premier League club Southampton and the Norway national team.

Early life 

Elyounoussi was born in Al Hoceima, Morocco and moved to Sarpsborg in Norway at a young age, where he started his professional career.

Club career

Sarpsborg 08
He made his debut in Tippeligaen when he came on as a sub in Sarpsborg 08's match against Odd Grenland on 8 May 2011.

Molde
On 15 March 2014, Elyounoussi moved to fellow Tippeligaen side Molde FK. During his first season with Molde FK he played in every league match and was the club's top scorer with 13 goals. With the club, Elyounoussi won both Tippeligaen and the Norwegian Cup in his first season, which meant that Molde won the double for the first time in the club's history. He scored four goals in the 2014 Norwegian Cup, of which one was scored in the final against Odd. Elyounoussi scored a total of 17 goals in all competitions in the 2014 season and became Molde's top goalscorer.

In 2015, Elyounoussi scored three goals in the 2015–16 UEFA Europa League, all in the group stage. He scored twice against Celtic and once against Fenerbahçe and helped the team advance to the Round of 16 where they lost 1–3 on aggregate against Sevilla.

Basel
On 6 July 2016, Elyounoussi moved to Swiss Super League side FC Basel on a four-year contract. He joined Basel's first team for their 2016–17 season under head coach Urs Fischer. After playing in four test games he made his domestic league debut on 24 July in the 3–0 home win at the St. Jakob-Park against Sion. He scored his first goal for his new club just one week later on 31 July during the away game against Vaduz. It was the third Basler goal of the game and they won 5–1. Elyounoussi scored a hat trick for Basel on 4 February 2017 during the home game against Lugano. These were the first three goals and were scored during the first 36 minutes of the game that Basel won 4–0. Under trainer Urs Fischer, Elyounoussi won the Swiss Super League championship at the end of the 2016–17 season. For the club this was the eighth title in a row and their 20th championship title in total. They also won the Swiss Cup for the twelfth time, which meant they had won the double for the sixth time in the club's history.

He stayed with the club for two season and durung this time Elyounoussi played a total of 102 games for Basel scoring a total of 27 goals. 65 of these games were in the Swiss Super League, eight in the Swiss Cup, 11 in the Champions League and 18 were friendly games. He scored 21 goals in the domestic league, two in the Champions League and the other four were scored during the test games.

Southampton
On 29 June 2018, Elyounoussi was signed by Southampton for a reported fee of £16 million, signing a five-year contract.

2019–2021: Loan to Celtic
On 30 August 2019, Elyounoussi joined Celtic on loan until the end of the season. On 30 June 2020, the loan was extended for a further season.

On 8 November 2020, Elyounoussi scored a hat-trick in a 4–1 victory at Motherwell.

2021–22: Return to Southampton
On 25 August 2021, he scored a hat-trick in an emphatic 8–0 win over League Two side Newport County in the second round of the EFL Cup. It was the biggest away win in Southampton's 135-year history and matched their biggest post-war win. On 28 August 2021, Elyounoussi scored his first Premier League goal for Southampton in their 2–2 draw with Newcastle.

International career
In June 2011, Elyounoussi was called up for the Norway U-17 team.

In November 2013, he was called up to the senior Norwegian national team for their January 2014 international matches in Abu Dhabi. He made his debut there against Poland on 18 January 2014, replacing Erik Huseklepp in the 33rd minute of a 3–0 defeat. He scored his first goal for Norway on 13 June 2017 against Sweden. He scored his first hat-trick for Norway on 5 October 2017 against San Marino.

Personal life
His cousin, Tarik Elyounoussi, is also a Norwegian international footballer who plays for the Japanese side, Shonan Bellmare.

Elyounoussi's father used to own a pizza parlour in Norway, where Mohamed worked while living in his hometown.

Career statistics

Club

International

Scores and results list Norway's goal tally first, score column indicates score after each Elyounoussi goal.

Honours
Molde
 Tippeligaen: 2014
 Norwegian Cup: 2014

Basel
 Swiss Super League: 2016–17
 Swiss Cup: 2016–17

Celtic
 Scottish Premiership: 2019–20
Scottish Cup: 2019–20
 Scottish League Cup: 2019–20

Individual
Scottish Premiership Player of the Month: October 2019

References

External links
Profile at altomfotball.no
Profile at sarpsborg08.no

1994 births
Living people
Moroccan emigrants to Norway
Norwegian people of Moroccan descent
Naturalised citizens of Norway
Norwegian footballers
Norway international footballers
Norway under-21 international footballers
Norway youth international footballers
Association football forwards
Sarpsborg 08 FF players
Molde FK players
Eliteserien players
Norwegian First Division players
Premier League players
Scottish Professional Football League players
People from Al Hoceima
People from Sarpsborg
FC Basel players
Southampton F.C. players
Celtic F.C. players
Norwegian expatriate footballers
Expatriate footballers in Switzerland
Norwegian expatriate sportspeople in Switzerland
Expatriate footballers in Scotland
Norwegian expatriate sportspeople in Scotland
Swiss Super League players
Riffian people